Dr. Basit Bilal Koshul is a Pakistani sociologist, and a member of the Rehmatul-lil-Alameen Authority. Bilal Koshal is an associate professor at Lahore University of Management Sciences (LUMS). His areas of interest include the relationship between religion and modernity, the philosophy of science, the philosophy of religion, the sociology of culture, and the competition between modern Islam and the West. He is particularly interested in combining the ideas of Muhammad Iqbal, Charles Peirce and Max Weber.

He received his first PhD in Religion Sociology from Drew University in 2003. After teaching at Concordia College for four years, he began in 2006 at the LUMS School of Humanities, Social Sciences and Law. He completed his second PhD in 2011 from the University of Virginia.

Authorship 
He has several publications, including books.

References

Living people
1968 births
Academic staff of Lahore University of Management Sciences
Pakistani writers
Pakistani male writers
Pakistani editors
Drew University alumni
Concordia College (Moorhead, Minnesota) faculty
University of Virginia alumni